The 2009 FIBA Europe Under-16 Championship for Women Division B was the 6th edition of the Division B of the European basketball championship for women's national under-16 teams. It was played in Tallinn, Estonia, from 30 July to 9 August 2009. Netherlands women's national under-16 basketball team won the tournament.

Participating teams

  (15th place, 2008 FIBA Europe Under-16 Championship for Women Division A)

  (16th place, 2008 FIBA Europe Under-16 Championship for Women Division A)

Preliminary round
In the preliminary round, the teams were drawn into four groups. The first two teams from each group will advance to the 1st–8th place qualifying round (Groups E and F), the third and fourth teams will advance to the 9th–16th place qualifying round (Groups G and H) and the other teams will advance to the 17th–19th place classification (Group I).

Group A

Group B

Group C

Group D

1st–8th place qualifying round
In this round, the teams play in two groups of four. The first two teams from each group will advance to the Semifinals and the other teams will advance to the 5th–8th place playoffs.

Group E

Group F

9th–16th place qualifying round
In this round, the teams play in two groups of four. The first two teams from each group will advance to the 9th–12th place playoffs and the other teams will advance to the 13th–16th place playoffs.

Group G

Group H

17th–19th place classification

Group I

13th–16th place playoffs

9th–12th place playoffs

5th–8th place playoffs

Championship playoffs

Final standings

References

2009
2009–10 in European women's basketball
International youth basketball competitions hosted by Estonia
FIBA U16
August 2009 sports events in Europe